Holy Family with Saints Elizabeth and John the Baptist may refer to:

 Holy Family with Saints Elizabeth and John the Baptist (Corregio, Mantua), 1511
 Holy Family with Saints Elizabeth and John the Baptist (Corregio, Pavia), 1510